Christophe-Paulin de La Poix, chevalier de Fréminville (24 January 1787 – 12 January 1848) was a French Navy Commander, naturalist, archeologist and pioneer of transvestism.

Career 
La Poix de Fréminville was born to a family of naval engineers, and joined the Navy in 1801. He served as an aide to Rear-Admiral Latouche-Tréville and distinguished himself on the gunboat  during Nelson's Raids on Boulogne.

At the age of 15, Fréminville was appointed to the 74-gun  as a midshipman and took part in the Saint-Domingue expedition, in which he witnessed and condemned the massacres perpetrated by General de Rochambeau.

During the campaign, he served as signals major, adjudant to the division, and hydrographer. He notably rediscovered the island of Enckuysen, which Bellin had placed at 65°N 12°W in maps in 1751 and 1767 and whose existence had been doubted, but which were spotted at 65°54'N 12°48'W.

The frigates sailed up to Spitsbergen, capturing a number of prizes, and returned to Iceland, where Fréminville measured several point of the coast. The squadron then cruised off Ireland and returned to France in September 1807, except Guerrière, captured by HMS Blanche on 19 July 1806.

Seeing little action in the seven following years, Fréminville achieved the rank of Lieutenant only in 1811.

In mid-1822, Néréide was in the Caribbean, and Fréminville fell in love with a Creole girl named "Caroline C." at the Îles des Saintes; Néréide was sent to Martinique and then to Guadeloupe meanwhile sailed along the coast of Saintes without stopping with Fréminville aboard. Caroline was misled, thinking that her lover was heading to Europe and would never return, and she committed suicide.

In 1824, Fréminville took command of the fluyt . The year after, he commanded the fluyt  in America. Constantly performing archeology and natural history surveys, he requested in vain command of an exploration mission. It was not until 1827 that he was promoted to Commander. In 1829, Fréminville was appointed to evaluate a chip log invented by Pierre Bouguer, which he deemed unsuitable.

Fréminville retired from the Navy in 1831. The same year, he pseudonymously authored an "Essay on the physical and moral influence of the female costume", in which he stated that female clothes
 The pseudonym "Caroline de L." that Fréminville used was later interpreted as a hommage to the Creole of the Saintes.

In his later years, he devoted himself to archeology and natural history, and his credited with founding the archeology of Lower Brittany. In 1836, he donated a luxurious model of a fictitious galley, Minerve, made by famed modelist Augustin Pic, to the Musée national de la Marine. He died on 12 January 1848.

Honours 
 Knight of the Order of Saint-Louis
 Knight of the Sovereign Military Order of Malta

Legacy
Fréminville is commemorated in the scientific name of a species of Central American snake, Stenorrhina freminvillei.

Works 
 
 
 
  (pseudonymous work)
  (pseudonymous work)

Notes and references

Notes

References

Bibliography 
Beolens, Bo; Watkins, Michael; Grayson, Michael (2011). The Eponym Dictionary of Reptiles. Baltimore: Johns Hopkins University Press. xiii + 296 pp. .
 
  
 
 Fonds Marine. Campagnes (opérations ; divisions et stations navales ; missions diverses). Inventaire de la sous-série Marine BB4. Tome premier : BB4 1 à 482 (1790-1826)

External links 

   E. Herpin.. — Mémoires du chevalier de Fréminville (1787-1848), capitaine des frégates du Roi, review

French Navy officers
French naval commanders of the Napoleonic Wars
1787 births
1848 deaths